The Yamaha XJ600 is a motorcycle manufactured by Yamaha. The XJ600 was built from 1984 until 1991, when it was replaced with the Yamaha Diversion/Seca II. In North America, the bike was sold as the FJ600. The 1984 Yamaha XJ600 and FJ600 were notable for being the first Japanese inline-4 motorcycles with a displacement of 600cc. They are also one of the first inline-4 motorcycles to use mono-shock rear suspension. Note: 2 years after the 1982 Kawasaki GPz550 Unitrak

Related bikes 

 Yamaha XJ900, the 900 cc brother of the XJ600.
 Yamaha Diversion/Seca II, the successors of the XJ600/900 series.

References 

XJ600
Standard motorcycles
Motorcycles introduced in 1984